Clara Villoslada (born 28 August 1980) is a Spanish snowboarder. She competed in the women's halfpipe event at the 2006 Winter Olympics.

References

1980 births
Living people
Spanish female snowboarders
Olympic snowboarders of Spain
Snowboarders at the 2006 Winter Olympics
Sportspeople from Buenos Aires